The Glendale Historic District encompasses the historic core of Glendale, Ohio.  Developed in 1851, Glendale is one of the earliest known examples of a planned residential village subdivision, its layout made using principles developed for rural cemeteries popular at the time.  The district features shaded winding residential lanes, and a large assemblage of well-preserved period buildings.  The district was designated a National Historic Landmark in 1977.

Description and history
South Troy parallels railroad tracks, and the village's business district basically straddles those tracks near Sharon Road. Congress Avenue is a major road passing through the district north from the junction of Springfield Pike and Oak Street. The area east of Congress Avenue is heavily residential, with winding roads and mature landscaping. There are two small parks in this area, both on East Fountain Avenue, which travels generally southwest to northeast. Houses in the district are mostly either Italianate or Second Empire, reflective of the village's development period in the 1850s. The railroad depot included in the district holds a museum of memorabilia of the village's past, including when John Hunt Morgan went through the village on his great raid.

Glendale was the brainchild of George Crawford and Henry Clark, two Ohio businessmen who saw the possibility of a suburban residential development along the railroad line of the Cincinnati, Hamilton and Dayton Railway.  To that end, they ended up purchasing  on which Glendale was built.   were laid out by Robert Phillips, a civil engineer, and development proceeded once the railroad began running in 1851.  The village streets were at first lit by coal oil lamps, which were upgraded by 1872 to natural gas; these fixtures are still used.

See also

List of National Historic Landmarks in Ohio
National Register of Historic Places listings in Hamilton County, Ohio

Notes

External links
Glendale Ohio National Historic District

National Historic Landmarks in Ohio
Historic districts in Hamilton County, Ohio
National Register of Historic Places in Hamilton County, Ohio
1861 establishments in Ohio
Historic districts on the National Register of Historic Places in Ohio